Cassey Ho Vinh (born in Los Angeles, January 16, 1987) is an American social media fitness entrepreneur with a YouTube channel and a website that sells fitness apparel. In 2013, she received a Shorty Award in the category of social fitness. In 2014, after seeing a photoshopped photo of a model on Target’s website where the model had an unnatural-looking thigh gap, Ho wrote on her blog calling attention to the health implications of this type of photo editing. Target subsequently apologized for altering the photo. In April 2015, Ho responded to negative comments about her body by creating a YouTube video called The "Perfect" Body. In 2017, Ho was listed in Time's third annual list of "The 25 Most Influential People on the Internet".

Early life and education
Ho is Chinese-Vietnamese American and was born in Los Angeles, California, but grew up in the San Francisco Bay Area. Her parents are Bach Ho and Cuu Ho and she has a sister named Jackelyn, who is a yoga instructor. Ho described how she grew up 'chubby', and that the way other children treated her made her become more aware of her body when she was young. When she was a teenager, she started a bakery with her mother called "Cooplex Cookies & Candies," which lasted from 2001 to 2005. Her interest in fitness and nutrition began when she was 16 and discovered Pilates. Ho has also said that it was her "childhood dream to become a fashion designer."

She went to James Logan High School. In 2003, she won the San Francisco Miss Teen Chinatown beauty pageant. She told Asian Fortune that coming from an Asian culture, her parents expected her to choose a career as a doctor or lawyer. When she was 16, she told her father that she wanted to be a fashion designer. Her father, in response, told her that she would fail, make no money, and have no friends. She went to Whittier College on a John Greenleaf Whittier full tuition scholarship with the career aim of becoming a doctor. She graduated in 2009 with a Bachelor of Science in biology.

Career
Ho started her online fitness businesses while she was still in college. In 2007, she was one of 18 winning designers featured at the "Emerging Stars" fashion show that occurred during San Francisco Fashion Week. Ho started posting fitness videos on YouTube in 2009 after she decided to move from Los Angeles, California to Boston, Massachusetts for a full-time job as a fashion buyer.  She had been a part-time Pilates instructor and wanted to provide the students she was leaving with online fitness workouts after she moved to Boston. The first video she uploaded to YouTube was called "POP Pilates: Total Body Sculpt video" and she had considerable trouble with its quality, audio, and editing. After she uploaded the video, she received a number of comments requesting more videos on specific workouts for different muscle groups such legs, thighs, and abs, but she didn't pay attention to these requests for months.

Nine months after she moved to Boston to work as a fashion buyer, she decided to quit because she disliked it. She started teaching Pilates classes 12 times a week to pay for her food and rent. She found teaching Pilates this often physically tiring, but because she was not working full-time, she had time to make more workout videos. She began uploading her new videos to YouTube and her views and subscribers began to rapidly increase. She then became a YouTube Partner and her website blogilates.com dramatically increased its web traffic. She also believes that a feature of one of her bags in Shape magazine in 2010 was a contributing factor in the success she has had in her career. After her bag was featured, she realized that she could make money selling bags and went to China to talk to manufacturers of bags. When she started her YouTube channel and began her Internet marketing of clothing, bags, mats, and fitness apparel, she briefly worked with a PR company, but decided she could handle PR for her businesses.

By October 2012, three years after she uploaded her first video to YouTube in 2009, she had 166,000 subscribers on her YouTube channel Blogilates
and by January 18, 2014, she reached more than 100 million views on her YouTube channel. By April 2014, her YouTube subscribers had increased to 1.2 million and a month later she had reached 138,000 Twitter followers. By December 2014, her Blogilates channel on YouTube had 1.8 million subscribers, 8 million views a month, 60,000 views a day, and is the top fitness channel on YouTube and by October 2016, her Blogilates channel on YouTube had over 3.2 million subscribers.

Her workout videos are often featured in online newspapers and videos. She is also considered a successful social media marketer who has appeared as an example of a successful social-media fitness entrepreneur in the book Social Media Marketing All-in-One For Dummies and other social media "how to" books. In 2014, Lionsgate's BeFit YouTube channel added Ho to their channel lineup. In an interview with EContent Magazine, Ho stated that she believes that one reason for her success on YouTube is because she keeps her videos "fun and playful."

She was interviewed by Forbes in 2012 as a woman who is rapidly becoming a star on YouTube along with several other women such as Issa Rae and Cassandra Bankson. She has been described as a poster child for Asian American entrepreneurial success on the Internet. At the 2014 Sundance Film Festival, she led yogilates workout sessions at the YouTube lounge.

In 2012, she won Fitness Magazine's Fitterati blogger awards in the category of "Best Healthy Living Blog." Sharecare also ranked her as the number 2 online influencer making a difference in the world of fitness just behind Jillian Michaels. In 2013, Ho won a Shorty Award in the category of social fitness.

In January 2014, MarketWatch reported that Ho was first on their top 10 list of Social HealthMarkers on fitness by Sharecare. In August, The Wall Street Journal reported that Ho's Blogilates YouTube channel was averaging almost 8 million views a month and that it is the top-ranked fitness channel on YouTube. In September, Seventeen magazine announced that its October issue would be its first YouTube issue featuring 30 well known YouTubers, with Ho to present her workout routine.

Clothing collection: Bodypop
In August 2014, Ho released "Bodypop", an activewear clothing collection.  According to Ro Kalonaros, writing for Shape, "The line is a mix between high fashion and practical—think peplum and bold prints." At the release of her activewear collection, Ho also released a music video of three female athletes wearing Ho's activewear. In January 2016, Ho launched the first collection of a new line, "Popflex."

Views

YOLO Meal
In addition to her YouTube fitness videos, Ho also has a YouTube series Cheap, Clean Eats. In this series, she introduced the concept of a "YOLO Meal" (YOLO is an acronym for "You Only Live Once"). A YOLO meal consists of what is considered traditionally unhealthy food such as pizza, french fries, and ice cream. In her view, a healthy diet should include YOLO meals because a healthy diet is a lifestyle that a person can stick with. YOLO meals are meals a person typically has with friends and they are planned, in her approach, to occur once a week and are surrounded the rest of the week by healthy meals. Kit Steinkellner reported in the Huffington Post that when she followed this approach she found that it increased her desire for both YOLO meals and healthy food. Georgie Silvarole, writing for Fiterazzi Magazine, extends Ho's concept of a YOLO meal to a YOLO day and explains that sometimes one needs a whole day off of a healthy diet.

Body image
When she first began to upload videos to YouTube and answering questions about fitness on her blog, she thought of herself only as only an instructor. It was at this time that she created a printable poster "How to Get a Thigh Gap".
At that time, she had not thought much about the social-health implications of trying to achieve a thigh gap and she didn't think about her poster again until it appeared two years later in news segments about the latest unhealthy obsession of trying to achieve a thigh gap. After that incident, she realized that she is not just a fitness instructor but a role model in the fitness industry. She now views her role as extending beyond a fitness instructor to include helping people get healthier and feeling better about their bodies.

In 2014, after she had realized that she had become a role model in the fitness industry, she was looking for a bikini on Target's website when she noticed an image of a model with a photoshopped thigh gap. She took some screen shots of the photoshopped model and blogged about them. The next morning she discovered that the Target model controversy was under discussion at a number of news media outlets such as ABC News, HLN, and Good Morning America. After her post drew widespread media attention, Target apologized for manipulating the photo. Ho has also warned that the "bikini bridge" may be the new "thigh gap" and that neither define beauty.

On her view, working out can become a problem when the only goal is "physical vanity" and thereby attempting to develop a sense of self-worth by working out. Instead, she advocates finding joy in the act of working out and letting it become part of one's lifestyle.

She believes that social media, and in particular social fitness media, has an important role to play in helping people achieve their fitness and healthy lifestyle potential. This is especially true for people who lack the family and friends to provide that support.

She believes that YouTube has an important role to play in issues concerning body image. On her view, body image is shaped by the "perfect" images of women in magazines and movies and that when women and girls pursue these "perfect" body images, the result can sometimes be eating and body image disorders. She believes that YouTube provides content creators with a platform to present girls and women as they really are, which she believes will encourage them to be more confident in who they are.

In January 2016, Ho came out to say that she struggled with an eating disorder following the extreme training and calorie restriction she did in preparation for a bikini competition in 2012. She said she was working out up to four hours a day while maintaining a 1,000 calorie diet in the lead up to the fitness and figure competition, and that her mind felt cloudy during this period. In a vlog posted on YouTube, she said she would not recommend this or any fitness routine that wasn't sustainable over the long-term.

Body-shaming response
In April 2015, Ho responded to an increasing number negative comments about her body by creating a video that quickly went viral.  In her YouTube video The "Perfect" Body, Ho receives negative social media messages about her body.  She is then presented with tools that allow her to "photoshop" her body into a socially perceived ideal body image.  However, when she looks into a mirror, she is dismayed by what she sees.  Ho's stated intent in creating this video was to respond to cyber-bullying with the goal "...to show that cyber-bullying and mean comments really affect people, and to think before you say something. I hope that people do the exact opposite after seeing this video, which is enlighten everyone around them with positivity."

Personal life
On August 22, 2017, Ho announced her engagement to longtime boyfriend Sam Livits on her official Instagram page. They married on October 6, 2018.

References

External links
 Official website
 YouTube channel

American exercise instructors
American people of Chinese descent
Living people
American YouTubers
Streamy Award winners
Whittier College alumni
1987 births
Health and fitness YouTubers
Shorty Award winners
People from Los Angeles